Arafat: A Monthly Critique of Muslim Thought was a monthly periodical founded by Muhammad Asad in Kashmir in 1946.

It was named after the plain of Arafat, the level area before the gates of Mecca where pilgrims spend the ninth day of Dhu al-Hijjah in huge camps as part of Hajj.  Asad was the editor, publisher and the sole contributor of the periodical.  In the words of Asad: "Arafat was a kind of 'journalistic monologue' meant to clarify - as much as might be possible for a single man - the great confusion prevailing in the Muslim community as to the scope and the practical implications of Islamic Law."

Arafat was primarily a vehicle for Asad’s ideas and a clarion-call at the critical time of Pakistan Movement, aiming at a fundamental reconstruction of an ordinary Pakistani Muslim's approach to the problem of Shariah. Three months before the partition, he wrote an article under the title “What do we mean by Pakistan?” in which he emphasized the real purpose underlying the future establishment of Pakistan. In another issue, published less than a month before the Independence Day, he penned an essay titled “Towards an Islamic Constitution” which was the first attempt ever made to outline the principles which must be incorporated in the constitution of any state that claims to be ‘Islamic’.

Essays that appeared in Arafat

"This Law of Ours" is a section of the book This Law of Ours and Other Essays which contains Asad's thesis on Islamic Law. The thesis is based on the following essays published in Arafat between September 1946 and February 1947.

 A Time of Change
 Talking of Muslim Revival
 Whose is The Fault? 
 A New Approach
 The Basis of our Civilization
 Islamic Civilization and Islamic Law
 Discussing a Proposition
 The Companions and the Law
 A New Development
 Imitation of Thought
 Creative Acceptance

"What do we mean by Pakistan", another section of the book This Law of Ours and Other Essays, is an essay that first appeared in Arafat in May 1947 (three months before the creation of Pakistan).

Other Essays

 The Outline of a Problem (September 1946)
 Why Arafat (September 1946)
 Bragging About Our Past (September 1946) 
 Is Religion a Thing of the Past? (October 1946)
 Notes and Comments (May 1947)
 Towards an Islamic Constitution (July 1947) 
 Arafat—Quarterly Journal of Islamic Reconstruction (March 1948)

See also
 Muhammad Asad Bibliography
 This Law of Ours and Other Essays
 Timeline of Muhammad Asad's life

References

External links
 Asad's original Arafat article re-published by Islamic Studies
 Criterion Quarterly
 Ikram Chughtai's piece

Defunct magazines published in Pakistan
Islamic magazines
Magazines established in 1946
Magazines disestablished in 1947
Muhammad Asad
Magazines published in Pakistan
Monthly magazines published in Pakistan